Ryan Pearson (born 31 July 1989) is an Australian association football player who plays for Sorrento FC.

Club career
Pearson made his senior debut for Perth Glory on 3 October 2010, coming on as a substitute in the 73rd minute against the Brisbane Roar.

References

External links
 Perth Glory profile

1989 births
Living people
Australian soccer players
Perth Glory FC players
Association football defenders